The District of Mackenzie was a regional administrative district of Canada's Northwest Territories. The district consisted of the portion of the Northwest Territories directly north of British Columbia, Alberta, and Saskatchewan on Canada's mainland.

Along with the District of Keewatin and the District of Franklin, it was one of the last remaining districts of the old Northwest Territories before the formation of Nunavut in 1999, at which point it ceased to exist. As an administrative district of the NWT it had ceased to function several years prior to division.

Today the area that formerly comprised the District of Mackenzie is mostly included in the Northwest Territories (which is no longer subdivided into districts). The remainder, along with all of Keewatin and most of Franklin, is in Nunavut.

See also
 Territorial evolution of Canada

References

Districts of the Northwest Territories